Adeoye Adetunji (born 28 November 1957) is a Nigerian boxer. He competed in the 1980 Summer Olympics.

References

1957 births
Living people
Boxers at the 1980 Summer Olympics
Nigerian male boxers
Olympic boxers of Nigeria
Light-middleweight boxers
Yoruba sportspeople
Citizens of Nigeria through descent